Words And Music is an album recorded by Paul Kelly and originally released in 1998.

Description
The album was released on Mushroom Records in Australia and Vanguard Records in the United States. It peaked at 17 in Australia and 44 in New Zealand and was certified gold.

Kelly was nominated and won an ARIA Award in the category Best Male Artist for Words and Music in 1998.

Songs
The US release included one additional track, "How to Make Gravy", which was released as a separate Extended Play prior to the release of Words and Music in Australia and was nominated as Song of the Year at the 1997 Australian Record Industry Association (ARIA) Awards.

The song "Little Kings" begins "I’m so afraid for my country, There’s an ill wind blowing no good, So many lies in the name of history" and includes the lyrics:

The title was used for the feature-length documentary film, Land of the Little Kings, which tells the stories of Indigenous children affected by being forcibly removed from their families, through the stories of Archie Roach and Ruby Hunter, and the song is sung by Roach in the film.

Track listing
All songs were written by Paul Kelly, except where noted.
 "Little Kings" – 5:17
 "I'll Be Your Lover" – 4:12
 "Nothing on My Mind" (Kelly, Peter Luscombe, Steve Hadley) – 4:55
 "Words and Music" – 4:40
 "Gutless Wonder" – 4:56
 "Tease Me" (Kelly, Bruce Haymes) – 4:08
 "I'd Rather Go Blind" – 3:12
 "She Answers the Sun (Lazy Bones)" (with Rebecca Barnard) – 5:24
 "Beat of Your Heart" – 5:48
 "It Started with a Kiss" (Errol Brown) – 4:15
 "Glory Be to God" – 4:07
 "Saturday Night and Sunday Morning" – 4:06
 "Charlie Owen's Slide Guitar" – 3:47
 "Melting" (Kelly, Monique Brumby) (with Monique Brumby) – 5:12

Personnel
 Rebecca Barnard – vocals ("She Answers the Sun" and "Beat of Your Heart")
 John Barrett – saxophone ("Gutless Wonder")
 Monique Brumby – vocals ("Melting")
 Renee Geyer – vocals ("Beat of Your Heart")
 Steve Hadley – bass
 Spencer P. Jones – guitar
 Paul Kelly – guitar, vocals
 Bruce Haymes – keyboards
 Laurence Maddy – horns ("Words and Music")
 Peter Luscombe – drums 
 Shane O'Mara – guitar
 Russell Smith – horns ("Words and Music")

Charts

Certifications

References

1998 albums
ARIA Award-winning albums
Paul Kelly (Australian musician) albums
Mushroom Records albums
Vanguard Records albums